The European qualification for the 2000 Men's Olympic Volleyball Tournament was held from 12 June 1999 to 9 January 2000.

Pre–elimination round
Dates: 12–19 June 1999
All times are local.
In case of an aggregate set tie, teams compare an aggregate point to determine the winner.

|}

First leg

|}

Second leg

|}

Elimination round
Dates: 3–12 September 1999
All times are local.
In case of an aggregate set tie, teams compare an aggregate point to determine the winner.

|}

1 Germany won 181–175 on the aggregate point.
2 Slovakia won 135–134 on the aggregate point.

First leg

|}

Second leg

|}

Pre–qualification tournament
Host:  Vilvoorde, Belgium
Dates: 17–21 November 1999
All times are Central European Time (UTC+01:00).

|}

|}

Qualification tournament
Venue:  Spodek, Katowice, Poland
Dates: 3–9 January 2000
All times are Central European Time (UTC+01:00).

Preliminary round

|}

|}

Final

|}

Final standing
{| class="wikitable" style="text-align:center;"
|-
!width=40|Rank
!width=180|Team
|- bgcolor=#ccffcc
|1
|style="text-align:left;"|
|-
|2
|style="text-align:left;"|
|-
|3
|style="text-align:left;"|
|-
|4
|style="text-align:left;"|
|-
|5
|style="text-align:left;"|
|-
|6
|style="text-align:left;"|
|}

External links
Official website

Volleyball Men Europe
Olympic Qualification Men Europe
Olympic Qualification Men Europe